Fredrik Gustafsson may refer to:
 Fredrik Gustafsson (academic)
 Fredrik Gustafsson (bobsleigh)
 Fredrik Gustafsson (film historian)

See also
 Fredrik Gustafson, Swedish footballer